Para dance may refer to:

Para Para, a synchronized dance
Wheelchair DanceSport, a disabled dance sport